The Madonna dei Galletti is  a Baroque-style, Roman Catholic church in Pisa, region of Tuscany, Italy.

History
Documents from 1227  mention a church at the site called San Salvatore in Porta Aurea; the latter is one of the gates of the walls of medieval Pisa.  The church underwent reconstruction in the 16th century. The façade was added in 1757 on designs of Ignazio Pellegrini. The gilded wooden ceiling from 1642 has been attributed to Del Norcia,  and the canvases therein to  Jacopo Vignali, Cecco Bravo, Lorenzo Lippi, and  Francesco Curradi. The church owes its name to a frescoed image of Madonna and Child attributed to  Taddeo di Bartolo, which was discovered in a biscuit box in 1640, and which is now found on main altar.

References

Madonna dei Galletti
16th-century Roman Catholic church buildings in Italy
Roman Catholic churches completed in 1757
Baroque architecture in Pisa